Mount Kohnen is a peak on the southwestern corner of Bowyer Butte, in Marie Byrd Land, Antarctica. It was mapped by the United States Geological Survey from surveys and U.S. Navy air photos, 1959–65, and was named by the Advisory Committee on Antarctic Names for Heinz Kohnen, a geophysicist at Byrd Station in the 1970–1971 summer.

References

Mountains of Marie Byrd Land